A by-election was held for the New South Wales Legislative Assembly electorate of The Hume on 31 March 1873 because James McLaurin resigned due to ill health.

Dates

Candidates
 Morris Asher was a businessman from Albury who had been elected member for the Hume at the first election for the district in 1859 but was defeated in 1860 and 1864.

 Thomas Robertson was a solicitor and pastoralist, a long time alderman of the Municipality of Deniliquin and former Mayor of Deniliquin. This was the first time he stood for the Legislative Assembly.

Result

James McLaurin resigned.

See also
Electoral results for the district of Hume
List of New South Wales state by-elections

References

1873 elections in Australia
New South Wales state by-elections
1870s in New South Wales